Wim Meijer (1923 – 2001) was a Dutch politician and a member of PSP.

See also
List of Dutch politicians

References

1923 births
2001 deaths
Pacifist Socialist Party politicians
Members of the House of Representatives (Netherlands)
People from Zwolle